The following is a list of notable academics within the field of criminal justice in the United States.

Criminal justice academics

 Persons notable for accomplishments in the field of criminal justice
 George J. Beto criminal justice expert
 Michael T. Cahill Dean of Brooklyn Law School
 John J. DiIulio, Jr.
 James Alan Fox professor of criminology at Northeastern University in Boston, Massachusetts
 Sanford Kadish 
 Gary LaFree
 Coramae Richey Mann professor emeritus of criminal justice at the University of Illinois at Chicago
 Katheryn K. Russell professor of law and director of the Center for the Study of Race and Race Relations at University of Florida's Fredric G. Levin College of Law
 Louis B. Schwartz (1913-2003), law professor at the University of Pennsylvania Law School
 Frank Schmallegerdirector of the Justice Research Association
 Jerome Herbert Skolnick professor at New York University and a former president of the American Society of Criminology
 August Vollmer leading figure in the development of the field of criminal justice in the United States in the early 20th century; first police chief of Berkeley, California
 James Q. Wilson academic political scientist and an authority on public administration
 Orlando W. Wilson

 Persons notable for accomplishments outside criminal justice
 Joe Biden notable primarily for his political career
 Lani Guiner notable for her scholarship in civil rights

References

Criminal justice
 
 
Academics
Academics